Huang Min-hui is a Taiwanese politician. She was a member of the Legislative Yuan from 1999 to 2005. Her tenure as vice chairperson of the Kuomintang (2008–16) overlapped with two terms as Mayor of Chiayi City (2005–14).

Education
Huang received her bachelor's degree in Chinese literature from National Taiwan Normal University and her master's degree in business administration from National Chiayi University.

Chiayi City Mayorship

2005 Chiayi City mayor election
Huang was elected as the Mayor of Chiayi City on 3 December 2005 and took office on 20 December 2005.

2009 Chiayi City mayor election
She was elected to her second mayoral term on 5 December 2009 and took office on 20 December 2009.

2018 Chiayi City mayor election
Huang announced her candidacy for the Chiayi mayoral primary in January 2018.

Kuomintang
Huang Min-hui was appointed acting chairperson of the KMT on 18 January 2016 after Eric Chu resigned to accept responsibility for the KMT's poor results in the 2016 presidential and legislative election. On 27 January 2016 Huang declared her candidacy for the KMT chairperson by-election. She submitted a petition of 67,926 signatures to the party on 22 February, to officially register as a candidate. The party confirmed 37,780 of those signatures on 26 February, validating her candidacy. Huang won 46,341 votes, finishing second in the election held on March 26.

2016 KMT chairmanship election

References

External links

 

Living people
1959 births
Chiayi City Members of the Legislative Yuan
Kuomintang Members of the Legislative Yuan in Taiwan
Members of the 4th Legislative Yuan
Members of the 5th Legislative Yuan
Members of the 6th Legislative Yuan
Mayors of Chiayi
National Taiwan Normal University alumni
Women mayors of places in Taiwan
Politicians of the Republic of China on Taiwan from Chiayi County
Chairpersons of the Kuomintang